is a 2007 Japanese romantic drama animated film written and directed by Makoto Shinkai. It theatrically premiered on 3 March 2007. The film consists of three segments, each following a period in the protagonist Takaki Tōno's life and his relationships with the girls around him.

The film was awarded Best Animated Feature Film at the 2007 Asia Pacific Screen Awards. It received a novelization in November 2007, and a manga adaption illustrated by Seike Yukiko in 2010.

Plot

The story is set in Japan, beginning in the early 1990s up until the present day (2008), with each act centered on a boy named Takaki Tōno.

Episode 1: Cherry Blossom
In 1991, Takaki Tōno quickly befriends Akari Shinohara after she transfers to his elementary school in Tokyo. They grow very close to each other due to similar interests and attitudes such as both preferring to stay inside during recess due to their seasonal allergies. Takaki and Akari begin to refer to each other using their given names without honorifics, which is an indicator of close friendship and intimacy in Japanese culture.

Right after graduating from elementary school in 1994, Akari moves to the nearby prefecture of Tochigi due to her parents' jobs. The two keep in contact by writing letters but eventually begin to drift apart. When Takaki learns that his family will be moving to Kagoshima on the other side of the country the following year in 1995, he decides to personally go see Akari one last time since they will be too far apart to see and visit each other once he moves. He also writes a letter for Akari to confess his feelings for her. However, Takaki loses the letter during the journey and a severe snowstorm delays his train for several hours. When the two finally meet late that night and share their first kiss, Takaki realizes they will never be together. They find a shed to spend the night in due to the severe snowstorm and fall asleep after talking late into the night. Takaki departs from the train station the next morning and the two promise to continue writing to each other. As the train rolls away, Takaki decides that the loss of his letter is not important anymore after the kiss while Akari silently looks at her own letter addressed to Takaki which she decided not to give him.

Episode 2: Cosmonaut

In 1999, Takaki is now in the third year of senior high in Tanegashima, where the Tanegashima Space Center is located. Kanae Sumida, a classmate of Takaki, has loved him ever since first meeting him in middle school but has never had the courage to confess her feelings to him. She tries to spend time with him, waiting long after school for the chance to travel home together. However, Takaki appears ignorant of Kanae's feelings and only treats her as a good friend. Kanae observes that Takaki is always writing emails to someone and staring off into the distance as if searching for something far away. It is later shown that Takaki's emails are not being sent to anyone, and he, in fact, deletes them after he finishes writing them. He also has recurring dreams which feature Akari. After a failed attempt to tell Takaki she loves him, Kanae realizes he is looking for something far beyond what she can offer and decides not to say anything, though she believes she will always love him. With such thoughts, she cries herself to sleep.

Episode 3: 5 Centimeters per Second
It is now 2008 and Takaki is a programmer in Tokyo. Meanwhile, Akari is preparing to marry another man. Takaki still longs for Akari to the detriment of his lifestyle. He receives a call from his current girlfriend but does not answer which signifies the end of the relationship. Depressed, Takaki quits his job as he is unable to cope with his feelings for Akari. Akari goes through a box of her old possessions and finds the letter she had written for Takaki thirteen years ago in 1995. Takaki finds himself in a convenience store reading a magazine about the decade long journey of the rocket launched in the 2nd act. Takaki and Akari begin a dual narration where they both recall a recent dream. In the dream they relive their last meeting in the snow-filled Iwafune and remember the wish to someday watch the cherry blossoms together again.

Later, while walking down the same road they knew when they were children, Takaki and Akari appear to pass and recognize each other at the train crossing. It's the same place they had promised to watch the cherry blossoms together thirteen years ago, just before Akari moved to Tochigi. On opposite sides of the tracks, they stop and begin to look back, yet a passing train cuts off their view. Takaki waits for the train to pass and finds that Akari is gone. After a moment, he smiles to himself and continues walking as the cherry blossoms stir in the train's wake.

Characters

Takaki is the main character of the film. Because of his parents' jobs, he is forced to move a lot. He and Akari become close friends, but when Akari moves away, they end up attending different junior high schools. In the second arc, he is shown to be an apt kyūdō practitioner and a member of his school's kyūdō club.

Takaki's best friend and love interest in elementary school. Like Takaki, she and her family move a lot. After elementary school, she moves to Iwafune. She suggests living with her aunt in Tokyo in order to stay with Takaki, but her parents forbid this. For a while, she and Takaki keep in touch via post.

A classmate of Takaki in junior high school and high school. She has been in love with Takaki since he began attending her junior high school, but cannot express her feelings to him. Kanae loves to surf and rides a moped to school. She doesn't know what she wants to do with her future. Her older sister is a teacher at her high school. In the manga, she is seen working as a nurse after the events depicted in the film.

Production
Makoto Shinkai had expressed that, unlike his past works, there would be no fantasy or science fiction elements in this film. Instead, the feature film would attempt to present the real world from a different perspective. Shinkai's film gives a realistic view of the struggles many people have to face: time, space, people, and love. The title 5 Centimeters per Second comes from the speed at which cherry blossoms petals fall, petals being a metaphorical representation of humans, reminiscent of the slowness of life and how people often start together but slowly drift into their separate ways. The movie marks the first time Shinkai has worked closely with a full staff of animators and artists.

Staff
Director, Writer and Original Creator: Makoto Shinkai
Character Design and Chief Animation Director: Takayo Nishimura
Background Art: Takumi Tanji, Ryoko Majima
Music: Tenmon
Production and Distribution: CoMix Wave, Inc.

Music
As in Shinkai's previous works, Tenmon composed this film's soundtrack. The film's ending theme was "One More Time, One More Chance" by Masayoshi Yamazaki.

Release
Finished on 22 January 2007, the first part streamed on Yahoo! Japan to Yahoo! Premium members from 16 to 19 February 2007. On 3 March 2007, the full-length film had its theatrical premiere at Cinema Rise in Shibuya, Tokyo.

In 2022, the film has received limited IMAX DMR release on 30 September 2022 in Japan in celebration of Suzume no Tojimari 's release. This marks its first time IMAX release.

Overseas releases
In the Philippines, 5 Centimeters per Second, along with Shinkai's previous work The Place Promised in Our Early Days, was premiered on July 21, 2013 at the SM Mall of Asia as part of the Philippines-Japan Friendship Month, with the help and cooperation from the Embassy of Japan in the Philippines, Japan Foundation Manila, SM Mall of Asia Cinema and the Film Development Council of the Philippines (FDCP). The showings attracted 1,500 moviegoers watching the anime films that tackles and focuses on friendships and love.

Home media
The DVD was released on 19 July 2007 in Japan. The title was licensed by ADV Films and scheduled for a December 2007 release, but the release was delayed until March 2008. The film's Region 2 DVD release date was pushed back from 4 March 2008 to April 2008. The Blu-ray version of the film has been released on 18 April 2008 in Japan. The HD DVD version of the film has also been released on 18 April 2008, which is region-free by default. The official Russian release by Reanimedia was already in stock in January 2008. The film is also licensed in Taiwan by Proware Multimedia International. On 11 July 2008, ADV announced that it was discontinuing print of the DVD. Bang Zoom! Entertainment has re-dubbed the entire film at the request of its original Japanese distributor, and the new dub was first streamed via Crunchyroll as part of their Day of Makoto Shinkai on 28 February 2009. On 13 August 2010, Crunchyroll CEO Kun Gao announced plans to release titles on DVD, starting with 5 Centimeters per Second. Bandai Entertainment manufactured and distributed the DVDs, which included the Bang Zoom! dub. This version was released 22 February 2011. In 2015, Discotek Media announced that it had licensed 5 Centimeters per Second for a DVD release on 2 June that year, and then 28 February 2017 on Blu-ray. On March 10, 2022, GKIDS announced they have licensed 5 Centimeters per Second, along with three other works by Makoto Shinkai and will re-release it on home video in 2022.

On 29 March 2009, distribution company Madman Entertainment announced plans to release 5 Centimetres Per Second in Australia, and released the DVD on 19 August 2009. Madman later released the film on Blu-ray alongside Voices of a Distant Star on 9 October 2019. In the United Kingdom and Ireland, Manga Entertainment distributed the film on DVD within the region on 14 March 2011, and on Blu-ray on 29 October 2018. Anime Limited later acquired the distribution rights within the United Kingdom and Ireland.

Reception
Natsuki Imai, a Japanese television and film director known for her 2007 film Koizora, views 5 Centimeters per Second as a film "completely for adults even though it is an anime".

The film won the Lancia Platinum Grand Prize at the Future Film Festival for best movie in animation or special effects. It won the Award for Best Animated Feature Film at the 2007 Asia Pacific Screen Awards. The limited edition DVD of the film was ranked 3rd on the Tohan charts between 18–24 July 2007, while the regular edition of the film was ranked 7th. The film was Japan's fourth most popular Blu-ray film in 2008.

Mania.com lists 5 Centimeters per Second as the best anime not by Hayao Miyazaki. The Japan Timess Mark Schilling commends Shinkai saying that he is better than Miyazaki "at piercing the veil of the everyday to reveal a poignant, evanescent beauty most of us notice only in rare moments." Anime News Network'''s Bamboo Dong commends the anime for its "heartbreakingly gorgeous" piano score composed by Tenmon, which "contributes to the dreamlike quality that the film has". She also comments that film "never comes out and tells you what the characters are feeling. It never follows a strict storyline, but between the interactions on the screen and well-timed shots of lonely landscapes, everything is as clear as night and day". Mania.com's Chris Beveridge criticises the anime for its aliasing as well as it "seems to get a fairly low bitrate during a lot of it which leads to some noisy and overly grainy feeling areas. The film has so many lush colors to it that a lot of them start to show too much noise at times which is almost as distracting as the aliasing." Theron Martin reviewing for Anime News Network commends "The production [which] also excels in its use of sound effects, especially in the bow-shooting scenes in Part 2".

In 2010, "Trains" magazine rated this film 45th of the 100 Greatest Train Movies.

Adaptations
Novel
The novel version of 5 Centimeters per Second, licensed by Media Factory, was released on 16 November 2007 in Japan. It was the first novel written by Makoto Shinkai. The photographs in the novel were also taken by Shinkai. The novel is licensed by Yen Press for North America.
The English translation was done by Taylor Engel. Another version of the novel, One more side, was released on 20 May 2011 in Japan. The author is Shinta Kanou, who also wrote the novels for Voices of a Distant Star and The Place Promised in Our Early Days, two of Shinkai's other films. The English translation of One more side was released on 26 February 2019 by Vertical Inc.

Manga
A manga adaptation of the film, illustrated by manga artist Yukiko Seike, was serialized in Kodansha's seinen manga magazine Afternoon from 25 May 2010 to 25 March 2011. Its chapters were collected in two tankōbon'' volumes by Kodansha, released on 22 November 2010 and 22 April 2011. It has been published in English as a single volume omnibus by Vertical Inc. The English translation was done by Melissa and Taka Tanaka. In the manga adaption, the second two sections of the story are expanded upon. Akari, Kanae, and Risa (Takaki's girlfriend from Episode 3) all receive much more focus.

Closet drama
A live recitation of the film is scheduled on 21 October 2020 to 25 October 2020 by the drama company "Reading Love" where all the 3 parts of the movie will be recited.

Notes

References

External links

Madman New Zealand
5 Centimetres per Second at Madman Australia
Introduction of the film on Makoto Shinkai's website 
5 Centimeters per Second Review at Anime+ Podcast
5 Centimeters per Second Review at HK Neo Reviews
Chris Beveridge's 5 Centimeters per Second Manga Review

2007 anime films
2007 Japanese novels
ADV Films
Anime with original screenplays
Bandai Entertainment anime titles
Best Animated Feature Film Asia Pacific Screen Award winners
CoMix Wave Films films
Discotek Media
Fiction set in the 1990s
Fiction set in the 2000s
Films directed by Makoto Shinkai
Films set in 1993
Films set in 1995
Films set in 1999
Films set in 2007
Films set in 2008
Films set in Kagoshima Prefecture
Films set in Saitama Prefecture
Films set in Tochigi Prefecture
Films set in Tokyo
2000s Japanese-language films
Kodansha manga
Seinen manga
Vertical (publisher) titles
Yen Press titles
Japanese anthology films